The Australia national cricket team toured New Zealand from February to March 1990 and played a single Test match against the New Zealand national cricket team which New Zealand won. New Zealand were captained by John Wright and Australia by Allan Border. In addition, the teams took part in a Limited Overs International (LOI) tournament with the India national cricket team which Australia won.

Test series summary

References

External links

1990 in Australian cricket
1990 in New Zealand cricket
1990
International cricket competitions from 1988–89 to 1991
New Zealand cricket seasons from 1970–71 to 1999–2000